The Leongatha Football Club, nicknamed the Parrots, is an Australian rules football and netball club based in the town of Leongatha, Victoria. The club teams currently compete in the Gippsland League.

Club history
Leongatha Football Club

Founded in 1894, the club has participated in various Gippsland football leagues over the last 100 plus years where the club has won a very credible 26 senior football premierships.

In 1903 the club was reformed with George F. Michael as President.

In 1910, Leongatha Junior FC (11.12 - 78) won the premiership, defeating Outtrim Junior FC (4.3 - 27).

In 1911, Leongatha FC joined the Leongatha and District Football Association, along with the South Leongatha FC.

In 1913, Leongatha finish second on the ladder with seven wins and their second semi final against Korumburra had to be played twice, after the first game was drawn. Korumburra won the replay by one goal. 

In 1915, the club colours were a blue guernsey, red sash with red and black stockings.  In July, 1915, the club's committee instructed club delegate's to terminate the football season due to the fact that eight Leongatha footballers are already at the front and seven more have enlisted in the Army.  Leongatha FC continued on and played out the season. 

Leongatha Juniors (1.4 - 10) were defeated in the 1922 grand final against Ruby (3.4 - 22).

In 1924, Footscray, VFA premiers, visited Leongatha in October and played a game that was marred by heavy rain squalls throughout the day. Leongatha (6.7 - 43) got up against Footscray (4.14 - 38) in a low scoring game. 

In 1934, Leongatha FC boasted 1200 members on their books! 

In 1948, Leongatha Second 18 commenced  playing in the Central Gippsland Football League''s Reserves competition. 

In 1954, Leongatha FC entered two teams in the South Gippsland Football League, Leongatha Green and Leongatha Gold, with Leongatha Green winning the 1954 premiership!

Leongatha Imperials Football Club

In 1929, the Leongatha Imperials Football Club was formed and initially played in the Bass Valley Football Association.   Leongatha Imperials were runner-up to Poowong in the 1929 grand final.  

In 1931 Leongatha Imperials moved across to the Woorayl Football Association. In 1934, the town of Leongatha boasted three football teams, with a team called Nerrena / South Leongatha entering the Woorayl FA in 1934 and 1935, with the "senior" team playing in the Central Gippsland FA. 

The “Imperials” won the 1934 Woorayl FA premiership defeating Mt. Eccles in the Grand Final.

In 1936, Imperials joined the Korumburra Lang Lang Football Association and lost the grand final to Lang Lang by three points.

In March, 1937, the Leongatha FC & the Leongatha Imperials FC decided to run both clubs under the one Leongatha FC committee. Leongatha Imperials Football Club won the 1937 Korumburra Football Association premiership, when they defeated Nyora in the grand final.

Football Competitions Timeline
Leongatha Football Club
 1894 to 1896 - Great Southern Football Association  
 1897 to 1902 - Club appeared to be in recess.
 1903 & 1904 - Great Southern Football Association 
 1905 - Woorayl Football Association 
 1906 to 1910 - Korumburra District Football Association 
 1911 - Leongatha withdraws from Korumburra DFA   & joins the Leongatha & District Football Association.
 1912 to 1914 - Korumburra District Football Association 
 1915 - Korumburra District Line Football Association. 
 1916 to 1918 - Club in recess, due to World War I
 1919 to 1923 Korumburra District Football Association  
 1924 to 1932 - Southern Gippsland Football Association  
 1933 - Club in recess. Could not find a league to enter after the SGFA folded. Leongatha Imperials FC entered a team in the Central Gippsland Football Association in 1933.
 1934 to 1940 - Central Gippsland Football Association
 1940 to 1945 - Club in recess due to World War II
 1946 to 1953 - Central Gippsland Football League    
 1954 to 1968 - South Gippsland Football League
 1969 to 1994 - LaTrobe Valley Football League
 1995 to 2001 - Gippsland LaTrobe Football League
 2002 to 2004 - West Gippsland LaTrobe Football League
 2005 to 2021 - Gippsland Football League

Leongatha Imperials Football Club
1929 & 1930 - Bass Valley Football Association
1931 to 1935 - Woorayl Football Association
1936 to 1941 - Korumburra Lang Lang Football Association

Football Premierships
Leongatha Football Club
Seniors (26)
Great Southern Football Association
1894 (undefeated - no grand final)
Woorayl Football Association
1905 (undefeated - no grand final)
Koorumburra District Football Association
1923 - Leongatha: 10.12 - 72 defeated Korumburra: 2.5 - 17 
Southern Gippsland Football Association 
1924 - Leongatha: 5.5 - 35 defeated Korumburra: 2.6 - 18 
South Gippsland Football Association
1931 - Leongatha: 14.8 - 92 defeated Wonthaggi Town: 5.10 - 40 
1932 - Leongatha: 18.23 - 119 defeated Mirboo North: 11.5 - 71 (undefeated premiers)
1934 - Leongatha: 15.14 - 104 defeated Moe: 15.13 - 103 

 Central Gippsland Football Association
1935 - Leongatha: 19.18 - 132 defeated Mirboo North: 7.5 - 47, 
1940 - Leongatha: 14.12 - 96 defeated Morwell: 11.6 - 72 
1951 - Leongatha: 13.18 - 96 defeated Yallourn: 13.8 - 86 

 South Gippsland Football League
1954 - Leongatha Greens: 8.14 - 62 defeated Korumburra Rovers 6.11 - 47
1955 - Leongatha: defeated Korumburra: 
1960 - Leongatha: 11.12 - 78 defeated Stony Creek: 10.9 - 69
1961 - Leongatha: 10.12 - 72 defeated Wonthaggi: 6.10 - 46
1963 - Leongatha: 8.8 - 56 defeated Korumburra: 7.6 - 48
1964 - Leongatha: 7.7 - 49 defeated Mirboo North 6.7 - 43
LaTrobe Valley Football League
1970 - Leongatha: defeated Moe:  
1977 - Leongatha: 13.14 - 92 defeated Traralgon: 11.11 - 77
1979 - Leongatha: 21.23 - 149 defeated Traralgon: 10.12 - 72
1982 - Leongatha: defeated ?
1989 - Leongatha: 12.7 - 79 defeated Maffra: 11.11 - 77
Gippsland Latrobe Football League
1995 - Leongatha: 23.24 - 162 defeated ?
1997 - Leongatha: defeated Morwell: 
West Gippsland Latrobe Football League
2001 - Leongatha: defeated ?
Gippsland Football League
2017 - Leongatha: 15.10 - 100 defeated Maffra: 15.9 - 99 
2018 - Leongatha: 10.13 - 73 defeated Maffra: 10.4 - 64

Leongatha Imperials Football Club
Seniors (4)
Woorayl Football Association
1931 - Leongatha Imperials: 10.7 - 67 defeated Mt. Eccles: 6.14 - 50 
1932 - Leongatha Imperials: 12.14 - 86 defeated Mardan: 9.8 - 62 
1935 - Leongatha Imperials: 15.13 - 103 defeated Mt. Eccles: 10.7 - 67 

Korumburra Lang Lang Football Association
1937 - Leongatha Imperials: 9.8 - 62 defeated Nyora: 7.9 - 51

Senior Football: Runner-Up
Leongatha Football Club
Seniors
Wooryl Football Association
1904 - Mt. Eccles: defeated Leongatha: by 17 points.

South Gippsland Football League
Leongatha were runner-up four times in the SGFL. Years ? 

LaTrobe Valley Football League
1980 - Traralgon: 19.16 - 130 defeated Leongatha: 12.12 - 84
1994 - Traralgon: defeated Leongatha: 
Gippsland LaTrobe Football League
1997 - Morwell: defeated Leongatha: 
1998 - Traralgon: 18.24 - 132 defeated Leongatha: 5.4 - 34

Gippsland Football League
2004 - Maffra: defeated Leongatha: 
2015 - Traralgon: 12.11 - 83 defeated Leongatha: 7.11 - 53 
2016 - Maffra: 13.10 - 88 defeated Leongatha: 9.13 - 67 
2019 - Maffra: 10.10 - 70 defeated Leongatha: 9.8 - 62 

Leongatha Imperials Football Club
Bass Valley Football Association
1929 - Poowong: 3.9 - 27 defeated Leongatha Imperials: 3.6 - 21
Korumburra Lang Lang Football Association
1936 - Lang Lang: 9.9 - 63 defeated Leongatha Imperials: 9.6 - 60

Notable players
The following list notes VFL/AFL footballers who played with the Leongatha FC prior to their VFL / AFL debut or were drafted to an AFL club.
 1913 - Johnny Hassett - Melbourne
 1925 -  Martin Larkin - Footscray & Hawthorn
 1926 - Jack Nolan - North Melbourne
 1934 - Tom Bawden - Essendon
 1938 - Bob Standfield - Essendon & Carlton
 1939 - Mick Keighery - Fitzroy
 1939 - Bob Bawden - Richmond
 1939 - Alan McDonald - Richmond 
 1942 - Jim McDonald - Melbourne
 1949 - Frank Bateman - Carlton
 1959 - Ron Kee - St. Kilda 
 1970 - Ian Salmon - Essendon
 1971 - Laurie Moloney - Essendon
 1972 - Garry Baker - Footscray
 1973 - Ivan Rasmussen - Footscray
 1983 - Stephen Wallis - Footscray
 1988 - Stuart Wigney - Footscray, Sydney, Adelaide & Richmond
 1989 - Sasha Dyson-Holland - Fitzroy. No senior AFL games. 1989 Draft No. 45
 1991 - Michael Johnston - Hawthorn & Footscray
 1999 - Christin Macri - Footscray
 2000 - Damien Adkins - Collingwood & West Coast Eagles
 2005 - Jarryd Roughead - Hawthorn
 2011 - Dyson Heppell - Essendon
 2020 - Zach Reid - Essendon. 2020 Draft No. 10

The following footballers played senior VFL / AFL football prior to playing / coaching at Leongatha FC. The year indicates the player's first season at Leongatha FC.
 - 1931: Reg Baker - Collingwood & Richmond
 - 1947: Murray Exelby - Essendon 
 - 1970: Terry Benton - North Melbourne
 - 1972: Max Parker - Footscray
 - 1980: Colin Boyd - Footscray & Essendon
 - 1994: Brian Royal - Footscray
 - 2003: Andrew Dunkley - Sydney Swans
 - 2003: Paul Hudson - Hawthorn

References

External links

 
 LFNC - Facebook page
 Gippsland FL: Premiership Teams
 Gippsland FL: Grand Final Records
 Gippsland FL: Best & Fairest Winners
 Former Australian Rules Football competitions
 1939 - Leongatha FC team photo
 1946 - Leongatha FC team photo
 1934 - Leongatha FC team photo
 1950 - Leongatha FC team photo
 2017 Gippsland FL Premiers: Leongatha FC

Australian rules football clubs in Victoria (Australia)
Australian rules football clubs established in 1894
Sports clubs established in 1894
1894 establishments in Australia
Gippsland Football League
Leongatha, Victoria
Netball teams in Victoria (Australia)